Sudbury station is a railway station in Greater Sudbury, Ontario, Canada serving Via Rail. It is the eastern terminus of the Sudbury – White River train. Located in downtown Sudbury, this historic Romanesque station built in 1907 by Canadian Pacific Railway, is one of the two VIA Rail stations in Sudbury, the other being Sudbury Junction station (serving The Canadian train) which is located 10 km away on the outskirts of the city. There is no shuttle service available between the two stations.

The station became the new home of the Sudbury Farmer's Market in 2013, following the 2012 purchase of the former Market Square by the Northern Ontario School of Architecture.

Location
Sudbury station is located in downtown Sudbury at 233 Elgin Street near the intersection of Elgin, Minto and Van Horne streets. Its main entrance faces northeast to Elgin Street. Directly southwest of the station building, trains call at a low level platform adjacent to the Canadian Pacific Railway Cartier Subdivision and bordering on the Sudbury Marshalling Yard. North of the station and across Elgin street is the Sudbury Community Arena.

See also
Sudbury Junction station
Capreol station
Sudbury Ontario Northland Bus Terminal
Sudbury Airport - 
 List of designated heritage railway stations of Canada

References

External links

 Via Rail page for Sudbury train station
 Train Schedule: White River - Sudbury
 Train Schedule: Sudbury - White River

Via Rail stations in Ontario
Railway stations in Greater Sudbury
Designated heritage railway stations in Ontario
Canadian Pacific Railway stations in Ontario
Canadian Register of Historic Places in Ontario